USS Mackinac has been the name of more than one United States Navy ship, and may refer to:

 , a patrol boat in commission from 1917 to 1919
 , a seaplane tender in commission from 1942 to 1947

See also
 
 
 

United States Navy ship names